The 1961 NCAA Swimming and Diving Championships were contested in March 1961 at the Pavilion Pool at the University of Washington in Seattle at the 25th annual officially NCAA-sanctioned swim meet to determine the team and individual national champions of men's collegiate swimming and diving in the United States. Including the championships held before NCAA sponsorship in 1937, this was the 38th overall American collegiate championship.

Michigan returned to the top of team standings, finishing twenty-three points ahead of defending champions USC, and claimed their tenth national title. It was the Wolverines' fourth championship in five years.

Team standings
Note: Top 10 only
(H) = Hosts
Full results

See also
List of college swimming and diving teams

References

NCAA Division I Men's Swimming and Diving Championships
NCAA Swimming And Diving Championships
NCAA Swimming And Diving Championships
NCAA Swimming And Diving Championships
1960s in Seattle